Bocagea longipedunculata is a species of plant in the family Annonaceae. It is native to Brazil. Carl Friedrich Philipp von Martius the German botanist and explorer who first formally described the species named it after its long ( in Latin) floral stalks ( in Latin).

Description
It is a small tree with erect, spreading branches.  Its branches have dark bark. Its oval to oblong leaves are 8.1-10.8 by 2.7-4.1 centimeters and come to a point at their tips. Its long thin peduncles are 4-5.4 centimeters and lack bracteoles. Its flowers have two rows of petals.  The green, oblong, exterior petals are 6.8 millimeters long and come to a shallow point at their tip.  The inner petals are oval. Its styles are short. Its stigmas have angular heads. Its ovaries are covered in shiny straight hairs.

Reproductive biology
The pollen of  B. longipedunculata is shed as permanent tetrads.

Habitat and distribution
Carl von Martius reported it as growing in Porto Seguro. It has been observed growing in rainforest habitats.

References

Annonaceae
Flora of Brazil
Plants described in 1841
Taxa named by Carl Friedrich Philipp von Martius